Bucerotiformes  is an order of birds that contains the hornbills, ground hornbills, hoopoes and wood hoopoes. These birds were previously classified as members of Coraciiformes. The clade is distributed in Africa, Asia, Europe and Melanesia.

Systematics
Recent genetic data show that ground hornbills and Bycanistes form a clade outside the rest of the hornbill lineage. They are thought to represent an early African lineage, while the rest of Bucerotiformes evolved in Asia. The hoopoe subspecies Saint Helena hoopoe and the Madagascar subspecies are sometimes elevated to a full species. The two wood hoopoe genera, Phoeniculus and Rhinopomastus, appear to have diverged about 10 million years ago, so some systematists treat them as separate subfamilies or even separate families.

Extinct Messelirrisoridae and Laurillardiidae families were both considered to be stem groups of a previously categorized Upupiformes order prior to it being subcategorized into Bucerotiformes.

Taxonomy
Order Bucerotiformes
Family Messelirrisoridae
Genus Messelirrisor
 Messelirrisor halcyrostris
 Messelirrisor grandis
 Messelirrisor parvus
Family Laurillardiidae
Genus Laurillardia
 Laurillardia longirostris
 Laurillardia munieri
 Laurillardia smoleni
Suborder Upupi
Family Phoeniculidae
Genus Phoeniculus
 Green wood hoopoe, Phoeniculus purpureus
 Violet wood hoopoe, Phoeniculus damarensis
 Black-billed wood hoopoe, Phoeniculus somaliensis
 White-headed wood hoopoe, Phoeniculus bollei
 Forest wood hoopoe, Phoeniculus castaneiceps
Genus Rhinopomastus
Black scimitarbill, Rhinopomastus aterrimus
Common scimitarbill, Rhinopomastus cyanomelas
Abyssinian scimitarbill, Rhinopomastus minor
Family Upupidae
Genus Upupa
Eurasian hoopoe, Upupa epops
African hoopoe, Upupa africana
Madagascar hoopoe, Upupa marginata
Suborder Buceroti
Family Bucorvidae
Genus Bucorvus
 Abyssinian ground hornbill, Bucorvus abyssinicus
 Southern ground hornbill, Bucorvus leadbeateri
Family Bucerotidae
Genus Bycanistes
 Trumpeter hornbill, Bycanistes bucinator
 Piping hornbill, Bycanistes fistulator
 Silvery-cheeked hornbill, Bycanistes brevis
 Black-and-white-casqued hornbill, Bycanistes subcylindricus
 Brown-cheeked hornbill, Bycanistes cylindricus
 White-thighed hornbill, Bycanistes albotibialis
Genus Tropicranus (sometimes included in Tockus)
 White-crested hornbill, Tropicranus albocristatus
Genus Tockus
 Black dwarf hornbill, Tockus hartlaubi
 Red-billed dwarf hornbill, Tockus camurus
 Monteiro's hornbill, Tockus monteiri
 Red-billed hornbill group
 Northern red-billed hornbill, Tockus erythrorhynchus
 Damara red-billed hornbill, Tockus damarensis
 Southern red-billed hornbill, Tockus rufirostris
 Tanzanian red-billed hornbill, Tockus ruahae
 Western red-billed hornbill, Tockus kempi
 Eastern yellow-billed hornbill, Tockus flavirostris
 Southern yellow-billed hornbill, Tockus leucomelas
 Jackson's hornbill, Tockus jacksoni
 Von der Decken's hornbill, Tockus deckeni
 Crowned hornbill, Tockus alboterminatus
 Bradfield's hornbill, Tockus bradfieldi
 African pied hornbill, Tockus fasciatus
 Hemprich's hornbill, Tockus hemprichii
 Pale-billed hornbill, Tockus pallidirostris
 African grey hornbill, Tockus nasutus
Genus Ocyceros
 Malabar grey hornbill, Ocyceros griseus
 Sri Lanka grey hornbill, Ocyceros gingalensis
 Indian grey hornbill, Ocyceros biostris
Genus Anthracoceros
 Malabar pied hornbill, Anthracoceros coronatus
 Oriental pied hornbill, Anthracoceros albirostris
 Black hornbill, Anthracoceros malayanus
 Palawan hornbill, Antracoceros marchei
 Sulu hornbill, Anthracoceros montani
Genus Buceros
 Rhinoceros hornbill, Buceros rhinoceros
 Great hornbill, Buceros bicornis
 Rufous hornbill, Buceros hydrocorax
Genus Rhinoplax (sometimes included in Buceros)
 Helmeted hornbill, Rhinoplax vigil
Genus Anorrhinus
 Austen's brown hornbill, Anorrhinus austeni
 Tickell's brown hornbill, Anorrhinus tickelli
 Bushy-crested hornbill, Anorrhinus galeritus
Genus Penelopides
 Luzon hornbill, Penelopides manillae
 Mindoro hornbill, Penelopides mindorensis
 Visayan hornbill, Penelopides panini
 Samar hornbill, Penelopides samarensis
 Mindanao hornbill, Penelopides affinis
Genus Berenicornis (sometimes included in Aceros)
White-crowned hornbill, Berenicornis comatus 
Genus Aceros
 Rufous-necked hornbill, Aceros nipalensis
Genus Rhabdotorrhinus
Wrinkled hornbill, Rhabdotorrhinus corrugatus
Writhed hornbill, Rhabdotorrhinus leucocephalus
Rufous-headed hornbill, Rhabdotorrhinus waldeni
Sulawesi hornbill, Rhabdotorrhinus exarhatus
Genus Rhyticeros (sometimes included in Aceros)
 Wreathed hornbill, Rhyticeros undulatus
 Narcondam hornbill, Rhyticeros narcondami
 Sumba hornbill, Rhyticeros everetti
 Plain-pouched hornbill, Rhyticeros subruficollis
 Papuan hornbill, Rhyticeros plicatus
 Knobbed hornbill, Rhyticeros cassidix
 Genus Ceratogymna
 Black-casqued hornbill, Ceratogymna atrata
 Yellow-casqued hornbill, Ceratogymna elate

References

Further reading

 
Neognathae
Bird orders
Extant Eocene first appearances
Eocene taxonomic orders
Oligocene taxonomic orders
Miocene taxonomic orders
Pliocene taxonomic orders
Pleistocene taxonomic orders
Holocene taxonomic orders
Taxa named by Max Fürbringer